WSIG is a Classic Country formatted broadcast radio station licensed to Mount Jackson, Virginia, serving the Central and Northern Shenandoah Valley. WSIG is owned and operated by Saga Communications, through licensee Tidewater Communications, LLC.

References

External links
Real Country 96.9 WSIG Online

1988 establishments in Virginia
Classic country radio stations in the United States
Mount Jackson, Virginia
Radio stations established in 1988
SIG